Darmody can refer to:

Places

 Darmody, Saskatchewan, Canada

People

 Aubrey Darmody, a Welsh footballer
 Jimmy Darmody, a fictional character in Boardwalk Empire
 Nathan Darmody, former drummer for Allstar Weekend
 Steve Darmody, an Australian rugby league player